Ruthe Katherine Pearlman (June 30, 1913 – January 30, 2007) was an American painter, art propagandist, art educator and philanthropist.

Early years
Ruthe G. Pearlman was born Ruthe Katherine Gottman in 1913 in Connersville, Indiana in a Jewish family of Julius Gottman (jewelry store owner) and his wife Yetta. The family moved to Cincinnati, Ohio in the 1920s. Young Ruthe found her path to art very early on in life. At the age of 16 she started taking art classes at the Art Academy of Cincinnati while being a student at Hughes Center High School. Although she married young to a Physician Dr. Albert Harry Pearlman, she never stopped her work as an artist.

Career 
She completed an art certificate program at New York Academy of Art in 1939, and was an instructor at the Art Academy of Cincinnati until December 2006, so she entered the Art Academy in 1929 at age of 16 and virtually never left. Ruthe traveled extensively with her husband throughout the United States and Europe always bringing new work and exhibiting at Art Academy of Cincinnati. She also had a studio in Cincinnati where she taught students for many years.

In February 2008 the Art Academy of Cincinnati named the main gallery in their exhibit halls in her honor.

Despite being diagnosed with macular degeneration in 1988 she continued to work and even went on to teach others with visual impairments. This led her to Art Beyond Boundaries, which was created in 2005 for people with disabilities who want to create art.

Pearlman was participating in the number of City of Cincinnati organizations such as Cincinnati Opera and the Cincinnati Symphony Orchestra and the Cincinnati chapter of Hadassah. She was also a member of the congregation of Isaac M. Wise Temple.

She was awarded an Honorary Doctorate of Fine Art by the Academy in 2002 and founded the Ruthe G. (after her madden name - Gottman) Pearlman Gallery in 2005.

Her art is exhibited at Art Academy of Cincinnati and a number of private collections in Cincinnati, Ohio and Baltimore, Maryland.

Personal 
Husband: Dr. Albert Harry Pearlman.
Children: Jerold (1938), Marsha (1941) and Dr. Michael Pearlman (1945 - 2020).

Legacy 

2008 - Art Academy of Cincinnati Pearlman Gallery

References 

1913 births
2007 deaths
20th-century American painters
21st-century American painters
American women painters
20th-century American women artists
21st-century American women artists